Lobão da Beira is a civil parish (freguesia) in the municipality of Tondela, Portugal.

Portuguese writer Cândido de Figueiredo was born in Lobão da Beira.

Demographics

References

Freguesias of Tondela
Towns in Portugal